Lauriano is a comune (municipality) in the Metropolitan City of Turin in the Italian region Piedmont, about  northeast of Turin.

Lauriano borders the following municipalities: Verolengo, Monteu da Po, San Sebastiano da Po, Cavagnolo, Casalborgone, and Tonengo.

References

External links
 Official website

Cities and towns in Piedmont